State Development and Investment Corporation (SDIC) (国家开发投资公司) is the largest state-owned investment holding company in China.  It was established on 5 May 1995.  SDIC's industrial investment mainly goes to power generation, coal mining, ports and shipping, chemical fertilizer production, and other infrastructure or resource-oriented fields as well as high-tech projects.

As a pilot company in state-owned assets management appointed by State-owned Assets Supervision and Administration Commission (SASAC) of the State Council of China, SDIC plays a role in optimizing the structure of state sector of the economy.

References

External links
 

Government-owned companies of China